Chukwuemeka Ademola Amachi "Chuks" Aneke (born 3 July 1993) is an English professional footballer who plays as a forward for Charlton Athletic.

Aneke began his career as a youngster with Arsenal, and spent time on loan with Football League clubs Stevenage, Preston North End and Crewe Alexandra before leaving for two seasons in Belgian football with Zulte Waregem. Returning to England in 2016, he spent three seasons with Milton Keynes Dons and two with Charlton Athletic before signing for briefly Birmingham City in 2021 before returning to Charlton Athletic in 2022.

He was capped for England from under-16 to under-19 levels.

Club career

Arsenal
Aneke joined Arsenal in 2001 at the age of seven, and progressed through the ranks. He made his reserve-team debut against Maidenhead United in a pre-season friendly on 28 July 2009. Aneke and fellow academy player Benik Afobe were offered the chance to visit FC Barcelona's training base with view to signing for them. However, he signed a professional contract with Arsenal in July 2010.

Ahead of the 2011–12 season, Aneke signed a contract extension with the club. He scored for Arsenal's reserve side in friendly victories against Woking, Hastings United, and Stevenage, and finally made his competitive first-team debut for Arsenal in the club's 3–1 League Cup victory against Shrewsbury Town on 20 September 2011, coming on as a 90th-minute substitute in the match.

Aneke joined League One club Stevenage on 22 November, on loan until 22 January 2012. He made his debut four days later, playing 57 minutes of a goalless draw at home to Walsall before being replaced by Darius Charles. Aneke was sent off for a high-footed challenge in a 1–0 defeat to Leyton Orient on 2 January 2012, resulting in a three-game suspension. It was later announced that Aneke would remain on loan at Stevenage until March, with a view to extending the loan until the end of the 2011–12 season.

Aneke returned to his parent club on 5 March, and on the same day scored in a 2–0 reserve victory against Chelsea. He joined another League One club, Preston North End, on 22 March on loan until the end of the season, linking up with Graham Westley who had managed him at Stevenage. He scored his first senior goal on his debut two days later in a 1–1 draw with Bury. He made two more starts and four substitute appearances without scoring in what remained of the season.

On 7 September, Aneke joined Crewe Alexandra of League One on a month's loan, and made his debut the next day as a second-half substitute against Tranmere Rovers. He started the following fixture, away at Stevenage, but received a second-half red card for a "two-footed lunge" so had to serve a three-match suspension. The loan was gradually extended until the end of the season, and Aneke scored six goals from 30 league appearances, of which 21 were as a starter. He also helped Crewe reach the 2013 Football League Trophy Final, started the match, and was involved in the build-up to the second goal as Crewe beat Southend United 2–0 at Wembley. Aneke returned to Crewe on loan for the first half of the 2013–14 season, and again his stay was extended to the end of the campaign. He finished as the club's top scorer, with 14 goals from 40 league matches, 16 from 44 in all competitions.

After thirteen seasons, Aneke was released by Arsenal in June 2014 at the expiry of his contract.

Zulte Waregem
On 21 June 2014, Belgian Pro League club Zulte Waregem announced the signing of Aneke on a three-year contract following his release by Arsenal. Over the following two seasons, which were interrupted by injury, Aneke made a total of 50 appearances in all competitions, scoring six goals.

Milton Keynes Dons
On 2 August 2016, while still recovering from a knee operation during the previous season, Aneke joined League One club Milton Keynes Dons, signing a one-year deal with an option of a second year. On 22 November, following almost twelve months on the sidelines through injury, Aneke made his league debut for the club, as an 84th-minute substitute in a 3–2 defeat at home to Chesterfield. He scored his first goals for the club with a brace in a 5–3 home win over Northampton Town on 21 January 2017, and scored twice against Peterborough United a week later. On 17 August, Aneke signed an extended contract keeping him at the club until June 2019.

In April 2019 Aneke was the subject of an alleged racist social media post. Following the club's relegation to League Two, Aneke was instrumental in helping Milton Keynes Dons achieve promotion back to League One at the first attempt, scoring 19 goals in all competitions during the 2018–19 season.

Charlton Athletic
On 28 June, having declined an offer of a contract extension with Milton Keynes, Aneke joined newly promoted Championship club Charlton Athletic on a free transfer effective from 1 July. He scored on his debut for Charlton in a 3–1 win over Stoke City on 10 August.

Birmingham City
Aneke followed his former manager Lee Bowyer to Championship club Birmingham City, where he signed a two-year deal effective from 1 July. He made his debut in the starting eleven for Birmingham's 1–0 win against Colchester United in the EFL Cup first round, and scored his first goal to complete a 5–0 league win away to Luton Town on 21 August.

Return to Charlton Athletic
On 14 January 2022, after just half a season at Birmingham City, Aneke rejoined League One side Charlton Athletic.

International career
Aneke has represented England at various youth levels. He was part of the England U-17 squad that qualified for the 2010 European Championship. However, Aneke was not in England's squad for the finals due to injury. He was replaced by Saido Berahino as England went on to win the tournament. Despite rumours that he had switched allegiance to Nigeria, Aneke was selected for the England U-19 team for a friendly against the Netherlands.

Style of play
Aneke is a player not known for his pace, but the ability to see a pass and physical strength. In 2011, he saw similarities between himself and then Arsenal teammate Abou Diaby. Arsène Wenger assessed his style of play as similar to that of Yaya Touré, whom Wenger had intended to sign in 2003 but failed when the player could not secure a work permit, in terms of "body power and good technique", able to "play behind the striker or in a deeper role as well."

Career statistics

Honours
Arsenal U18
Premier Academy League: 2009–10

Crewe Alexandra
Football League Trophy: 2012–13

England U16
Victory Shield: 2008

England U17
UEFA European Under-17 Championship: 2010

References

External links

1993 births
Living people
Footballers from Leyton
English footballers
England youth international footballers
Association football midfielders
Arsenal F.C. players
Stevenage F.C. players
Preston North End F.C. players
Crewe Alexandra F.C. players
S.V. Zulte Waregem players
Milton Keynes Dons F.C. players
Charlton Athletic F.C. players
Birmingham City F.C. players
English Football League players
Belgian Pro League players
Expatriate footballers in Belgium
English expatriate sportspeople in Belgium
Black British sportsmen
English people of Nigerian descent
People educated at St Bonaventure's Catholic School